The Changi Business Park (Abbreviation: CBP; ; Chinese: 樟宜商业园) is a business park located in Changi South, in the eastern part of Singapore.

Launch
Launched in July 1997, the 66-hectare or Changi Business Park is JTC Corporation's second business park following the International Business Park in Jurong East. The Changi Business Park comprises a mix of high technology business, data and software enterprises, research and development divisions and knowledge intensive facilities.

The Changi Business Park is located near to Changi Airport, the Aviation Distri-Zone and logistics facilities. This simplifies transportation and logistics arrangements for businesses leading to significant cost savings.

The business park is also close to Singapore Expo, one of South East Asia’s largest exhibition centres and easily accessible to the Central Business District by rail via the Expo MRT station and by road via the Pan Island Expressway and the East Coast Parkway.

Completed in 2012, a large area of 71.07-hectare Changi Business Park would open as a mixed-use development project. Comprising a retail shopping mall, office building, and hotel building, the project was redeveloped by a joint venture between Ascendas Land and Frasers Centrepoint. Construction of the project was undertaken by Japanese general construction contractor Nakano Corporation.

Investors can lease land sites from JTC Corporation to construct their facilities.

List of CBP Businesses
Within the past year, CBP has expanded greatly, and it now houses—or is in close proximity to—the following businesses (or branches/satellite offices of business), just to name a few:
Changi City Point mall, Park Avenue Hotels & Suites
NTUC FairPrice supermarket, 
Fitness First gym, 
Cisco, 
Wang cafe kaya toast & teh C eatery,
Mizuno,
IBM, 
Nestle, 
Ajisen Ramen, 
DBS Bank, 
Credit Suisse, 
Standard Chartered, 
Citibank, 
JPMorgan,
Subway sandwich restaurant, 
Just Salad eatery, 
Crowne Plaza Changi Airport hotel.
The Singapore University of Technology and Design (SUTD) is also located at CBP.

Accessing CBP

Rail
Changi Business Park is served by Expo MRT station.

Bus
Changi Business Park can be accessed via an on-demand, free shuttle service from Changi Airport. Three other paid-for bus services terminate at the bus terminal: route 20 from Tampines, route 47 from Marine Parade (looping back at Amber Road) and route 118 from Punggol.

Changi Business Park Bus Terminal
Changi Business Park Bus Terminal is a bus terminal located in the north of Changi Business Park in the eastern part of Singapore. The terminal is located adjacent to the Singapore University of Technology & Design campus in Changi South. Construction of the terminal started in 2014 and was subsequently completed the year after.

References

External links

Changi Business Park at JTC Corporation
ChangiBusinessPark.com

Business parks of Singapore
Changi
1997 establishments in Singapore